Swingtime! is an album by the Canadian Brass, released in 1995.  The album featured arrangements of several jazz standards.

Personnel
The Canadian Brass:
Charles Daellenbach:  tuba
Fred Mills:  trumpet
David Ohanian:  horn
Ronald Romm:  trumpet
Eugene Watts:  trombone

Also featuring:
Warren Bernhardt:  piano on tracks 2 and 5; keyboards on tracks 1, 16, 13 and 14
Natalie Cenovia Cummins:  violin on tracks 5 and 11
Crystal Garner:  viola on tracks 5 and 11
Gordon Gottlieb:  percussion on tracks 1, 2, 6, 11, 13 and 14
Evan Johnson:  violin on tracks 5 and 11
Karen Karlsrud:  violin on tracks 5 and 11
Maria Kitsopoulos:  cello on tracks 5 and 11
John Miller:  bass on tracks 1, 5, 6, 11, 13 and 14
Richard Stoltzman:  clarinet on track 6
Joe Taylor:  guitar on track 14
Belinda Whitney-Barratt:  violin on tracks 5 and 11
Ronnie Zito:  drums on tracks 1, 5, 6, 13 and 14

The Canadian Brass Jazz All-Stars appear on tracks 1, 6, 13 and 14.  The personnel for this ensemble is as follows:

Don Sebesky:  leader
Neil Balm:  trumpet
Warren Bernhardt:  keyboard
Gene Bertoncini:  guitar
Rick Baptist:  trumpet
Bob Carlisle:  French horn on tracks 1 & 13
Larry Farrell:  trombone
Paul Faulise:  bass trombone
Lawrence Feldman:  alto sax, flute, piccolo and clarinet on tracks 6 & 14
Peter Gordon:  French horn on tracks 1 & 13
Gordon Gottlieb:  percussion
Ken Hitchcock:  tenor sax, bass clarinet and clarinet on tracks 6 & 14
Tony Kadleck:  trumpet
Jeff Lang:  French horn on tracks 1 & 13
John Miller:  bass
Kevin O'Quinn:  trombone
Joe Passaro:  percussion
Roger Rosenberg:  bass clarinet, baritone sax and flute on tracks 6 & 14
Dave Tofani:  tenor sax, flute and clarinet on tracks 6 & 14
Chuck Wilson:  also sax, flute and clarinet on tracks 6 & 14
Ronnie Zito:  drums

Three tracks on this album also feature archival jazz recordings from the 1950s.

"Night and Day" features a performance from the Zoot Sims Quartet, recorded at the Vogue Studios in Paris in 1950.  The lineup was:  Zoot Sims: tenor saxophone, Gerry Wiggins: piano, Pierre Michelot: bass, Kenny Clarke: drums.

"The Lady is a Tramp" features a performance from the Gerry Mulligan Quartet, recorded live at the Salle Pleyel in Paris on June 3, 1954.  The lineup was: Gerry Mulligan: baritone sax, Bob Brookmeyer: valve trombone, Red Mitchell: bass, Frank Isola: drums.

"The Man I Love" features a performance by Roy Eldridge, recorded at the Vogue Studios in Paris on June 9, 1950.  The lineup for this performance was: Roy Eldridge: trumpet, Zoot Sims: tenor saxophone, Dick Hyman: piano, Pierre Michelot: bass, Ed Shaughnessy: drums.

The album was produced and mixed by Steve Vining.

Track listing
1.  "Artistry in Rhythm" (Stan Kenton) (5:05)
2.  "Blue Rondo a la Turk" (Dave Brubeck) (4:29)
3.  "Back Home in Indiana" (James F. Hanley-Ballard MacDonald) (3:13)
4.  "Night and Day" (Cole Porter) (3:00)
5.  "'Round about Midnight" (Thelonious Monk-Cootie Williams-Bert Hanighen) (5:03)
6.  "At the Woodchopper's Ball" (Joe Bishop-Woody Herman) (3:21)
7.  "The Lady is a Tramp" (Richard Rodgers-Lorenz Hart) (3:45)
8.  "Sugar Blues" (Clarence Williams-Lucy Fletcher) (2:47)
9.  "The Man I Love" (George Gershwin-Ira Gershwin) (3:32)
10. "Whatever Happened To The Dream" (Luther Henderson) (2:48)
11. "Concierto de Aranjuez" (Joaquin Rodrigo) (9:10)
12. "I Found Love" (Chris Dedrick) (3:35)
13. "Ellington Medley" (4:03)
(a) "Mood Indigo" (Duke Ellington-Barney Bigard-Irving Mills)
(b) "Don't Get Around Much Anymore" (Duke Ellington-Bob Russell)
(c) "Take the "A" Train" (Billy Strayhorn)
14. "One O'Clock Jump" (Count Basie) (4:39)

(Tracks 1, 6, 13 and 14 arranged by Don Sebesky.  Tracks 2, 4, 5, 7, 9, 10, 11 and 12 arranged by Chris Dedrick.  Tracks 3 and 8 arranged by Luther Henderson.)

References 

Listing on Amazon USA, consulted May 25, 2012

Canadian Brass discography, consulted May 25, 2012

1995 albums